Krasków  is a village in the administrative district of Gmina Marcinowice, within Świdnica County, Lower Silesian Voivodeship, in south-western Poland.

Etymology
The name of the village is of Polish origin and comes from the word kraska, which means "roller".

Sights
Krasków is the site of a Baroque palace, built by the Bohemian Zedlitz-Leipe noble family in 1746, allegedly according to plans by Joseph Emanuel Fischer von Erlach. Situated in a park laid out by Peter Joseph Lenné in 1848 it today serves as a hotel.

References

Villages in Świdnica County
Palaces in Poland